Opium is an Oriental-spicy perfume created for fashion brand Yves Saint Laurent (YSL) by perfumer Jean Amic and Jean-Louis Sieuzac of Roure, first marketed in 1977. Its top notes are a mixture of fruit and spices, with mandarin orange, plum, clove, coriander and pepper, as well as bay leaf. Its floral middle notes consist predominantly jasmine, rose and Lily of the Valley, in addition to carnation, cinnamon, peach and orris root. It is underlined by the sweet woody base note containing sandalwood, cedarwood, myrrh, opopanax, labdanum, benzoin and castoreum, in addition to amber, incense, musk, patchouli, tolu and vetiver.

Naming and theme
Opium caused a stir with its controversial name and brought accusations that brand designer Yves Saint Laurent was condoning drug use. In the United States, a group of Chinese Americans demanded a change of the name and a public apology from Saint Laurent for "his insensitivity to Chinese history and Chinese American concerns." They formed a committee called the American Coalition Against Opium and Drug Abuse, which expressed outrage at the choice of a name representing "a menace that destroyed many lives in China." However, the controversy in part helped to aid the perfume's publicity, with the perfume soon becoming a best-selling scent.

For its U.S. launch party in 1978, a tall ship Peking was rented from the South Street Seaport Museum in New York's East Harbor, and writer Truman Capote sat at the helm of the ship at the party. The ship was draped with banners of gold, red, and purple, and the Oriental theme was displayed with a  bronze statue of the Buddha, decorated with white cattleya orchids.

Opium, Lilac Perfume Oil and White Musk from The Body Shop, Juniper Breeze from Bath & Body Works and Royal Secret formerly Germaine Monteil were among the perfumes tested in 2003 in a study of the relationship of scents to memory.

Ad campaign controversy
A poster advertising campaign for the perfume caused another controversy in October and November 2000. It featured the model Sophie Dahl lying on her back wearing only a pair of stiletto heels, seemingly in the throes of ecstasy, with her legs spread apart as she covers one of her nipples with her hand. This ad campaign, photographed by Steven Meisel, was widely seen in print ads and posters in bus shelters in many countries. It won an award in Spain but generated an uproar in other places, particularly in the United Kingdom. The British Advertising Standards Authority received more than 700 complaints from the public, and ordered the posters to be withdrawn on the grounds that they were too sexually suggestive, degrading to women, and likely to cause "serious or widespread offence". American journalist Susan Faludi argued that certain perfume ad campaigns pushed "idealization of weak yielding women" to the extreme, citing the Opium advertisement as a primary example.

Opium pour Homme
YSL launched the male complement Opium pour Homme in 1995, created by Jacques Cavallier of Firmenich. Its main note is set by vanilla, with black currant, galangal, star anise, ginger and pepper, fusing with basic notes of cedar and Tolu balsam. Its flask was designed by Jérôme Failliant-Dumas.

Commercials
In 1992 and 1999, U.S. film director David Lynch created commercials for Opium.

References

External links
 Yves Saint Laurent (ysl-parfums.com)

Perfumes
Products introduced in 1977
Yves Saint Laurent (brand)